Ellenwood may refer to:

Ellenwood, Georgia, an unincorporated community in Georgia, United States
Georgia Ellenwood (born 1995), Canadian athlete